Black-n-Bluegrass RollerGirls (BBRG)  is a women's flat track roller derby league based in Northern Kentucky. Founded in 2006, Black-n-Bluegrass is a member of the Women's Flat Track Derby Association (WFTDA).

History and organization
The league was founded in May 2006, the first flat track league in northern Kentucky. It held its first season in 2008, and, by 2011, the league had more than forty skaters. By late 2011, the league had expanded its fanbase such that home games were held at the Bank of Kentucky Center.

Black-n-Bluegrass was accepted into the Women's Flat Track Derby Association Apprentice Program in April 2010, and became a full member of the WFTDA in March 2012.

As of 2017, Black-n-Bluegrass holds home games at Hits Indoor Baseball Park in Covington, KY. The league consists of over 30 skaters and rosters two teams, the Black-Outs (A team) and the Shiners (B team) which compete with other teams from other leagues.

The league has a junior roller derby section for skaters under 18 who play by the JRDA ruleset.

Rankings

References

Covington, Kentucky
Roller derby leagues established in 2006
Roller derby leagues in Kentucky
Women's Flat Track Derby Association Division 3
Women's sports in Kentucky
2006 establishments in Kentucky